Turks in Sweden or Swedish Turks are people of ethnic Turkish origin living in Sweden. The majority of Swedish Turks descend from the Republic of Turkey; however there has also been significant Turkish migration waves from other post-Ottoman countries including ethnic Turkish communities which have come to Sweden from the Balkans (e.g. from Bulgaria, Greece, Kosovo, North Macedonia and Romania), the island of Cyprus, and more recently Iraq and Syria. 

In 2009 the Swedish Minister for Foreign Affairs estimated that there was 100,000 people in Sweden with a Turkish background, and a further 10,000 Swedish-Turks living in Turkey. Many Turks in Sweden have double citizenship and 37,000 are registered voters in Turkey.

History
The first Turks came to Sweden in the early 18th century from the Ottoman Empire, whilst the second wave came in the 1960s from modern post-Ottoman nation states, especially from Turkey but also from the Balkans (mainly Bulgaria and North Macedonia), but also from the island of Cyprus. More recently, since the European migrant crisis Turks from Iraq and Syria have also come to  Sweden.

Charles XII creditors
During the Battle of Poltava in 1709, Charles XII's Swedish field army was defeated by the Russians. To escape arrest by the Russians, Charles XII had to leave the defeated army and go to the Ottoman Empire where he stayed for five years. Upon his return to Sweden in 1715, a smaller number of creditors came to Sweden to collect the debt he owed them. But it took a few years before they got repaid so they stayed a while. They left after getting paid.
According to the prevailing church law, everyone who was in Sweden, but was not a member of the Swedish state church, would be baptized. In order for the Muslim and Jewish creditors to avoid this, Charles XII wrote a free letter so that they could perform their Islamic services without being punished. The free letter showed that Karlskrona was the first city in Sweden where Muslims could perform their worship. According to Harry Svensson, this fleet's presence in Karlskrona has contributed to the religious and culturally open climate in the city over the past 300 years.

Modern migration wave

The second wave of Turks who came to Sweden was in the 1960s when Sweden opened the door to labor immigration. Most ethnic Turks arrived from the Republic of Turkey as well as Bulgaria and  Yugoslavia. 

Turks who came from the former Yugoslavia in the 1960s came largely from the Prespa region. From different contexts, many knew each other and they began to organize and strive for common interests. Approximately, 5,000 Macedonian Turks settled in Sweden, with 90% (i.e. 4,500) living in Malmö. 

Due to the forced Bulgarian assimilation policies, approximately 30,000 Bulgarian Turks have migrated to Sweden, most of which arrived in the late 1980s.

More recently, since the European migrant crisis (2014-2020), there has been a significant rise in the number of Iraqi Turks and Syrian Turks.

Turkish organizations

Mosques controlled by Diyanet 

According to Dagens Nyheter in 2017, nine mosques in Sweden have imams sent and paid for by the Turkish Directorate of Religious Affairs (Diyanet). Along with their religious duties, the imams are also tasked with reporting on critics of theTurkish government. According to Dagens Nyheter, propaganda for president Erdogan is openly presented in the mosques.
 Muslimska församlingen i Malmö (translation: Muslim congregation in Malmö) is a Turkish congregation connected to the Turkish directorate of Religious Affairs, Diyanet. According to its own records, it has 2200 members. The imam was trained and sent by Diyanet. According to the Swedish Agency for Support to Faith Communities, the mosque has good relations to the Malmö Millî Görüş chapter. In 2011, after decades of collecting donations from its members, it bought a property to use as a mosque for 8 million SEK. In 2017, the congregation donated its property to Svenska Islam stiftelsen (Turkish: Isveç Diyanet Vakfı) which is part of Diyanet.
 Fittja Mosque

Football clubs
In 1973 the Macedonian Turks formed the KSF Prespa Birlik football club.

Politics and elections 
In the 2018 Swedish general election, 10 000 Swedish citizens living in Turkey were expected to cast their votes in Turkey.
Turkey demanded that Sweden ends its alleged support for the Gülen movement.

Notable Swedish Turks 

, writer and journalist (Turkish mother and Syrian father)
 , installation artist 
Kadim Akça, billionaire; founder of Keep Holding
 , installation artist
Sinan Ayrancı, football player
Kazım Ayvaz, Olympic wrestler 
Erol Bekir, football player and sports coach (Turkish Macedonian origin)
 , architect 
Ergun Caner, author (Turkish father and Swedish mother)
 , voice actress
 , actor
Erdin Demir, football player
Rodin Deprem, football player
 , actress 
İlhan Erşahin, musician 
Muvaffak "Maffy" Falay, trumpeter
Amine Gülşe, actress, model, Miss Turkey 2014 (Turkish mother and Turkish Iraqi father)
Serkan Günes, photographer
Leyla Güngör, football player (Turkish father and Swedish mother)
 , theater director and translator 
 , journalist 
Dennis Gyllensporre, army officer 
 Roza Güclü Hedin, member of the S/SAP (Turkish mother and Kurdish father)
 , journalist 
Deniz Hümmet, football player
Erkan Inan, basketball player
Serkan İnan, basketball player
Mehmet Kaplan, politician
 , photographer 
 , journalist 
İlhan Koman, sculptor 
Ferhat Korkmaz, football player 
Vendela Kirsebom, model and actress (Turkish father and Norwegian mother)
, one of the founders of the People's Liberation Party-Front of Turkey
Sara Lumholdt, pop singer
Katarina Magnussadotter, (birthname unknown; died-1414) Turkish slave girl who converted to Christianity; she became a nun in Vadstena Abbey and was a gift from Queen Joanna I of Naples
Mehmet Mehmet, football player (Turkish Bulgarian origin)
Ayda Mosharraf, singer (Turkish mother and Iranian father)
Emin Nouri, football player (Turkish Bulgarian origin)
Yksel Osmanovski (Yüksel Osmanoğlu), football player (Turkish Macedonian origin)
Mahmut Özen, football player
 , film director 
 , photographer 
Sermin Özürküt, politician 
Erdal Rakip, football player (Turkish Macedonian origin)
Sibel Redzep (Sibel Recep), popular Swedish singer (Turkish Macedonian origin)
Erkan Sağlık, football player
, ice hockey player
Bora Serbülent, singer and founder of İsveç Türk Radyosu (Turkish Cypriot origin)
 , TV personality 
Meral Tasbas, television personality, singer and actress
Demir Turgut, Olympic sailor 
Pınar Yalçın, football player 
Richard Yarsuvat, football player (Turkish father and Kosovan-Albanian mother)
Anthony Yigit, boxer at the 2012 Summer Olympics
Mikail Yüksel, politician and founder of the Partiet Nyans (Nuance Party)
Erkan Zengin, football player

See also
Turks in Europe
Turks in Denmark
Turks in Finland 
Turks in Austria 
Turks in Germany 
Turks in France 
Turks in the Netherlands
Turks in Norway
Mustapha Aga
Kurds in Sweden
Islam in Sweden

Notes

Bibliography 
. (Turkic Swedish: İ'svoç Túrkhlärih)

Further reading 
Abadan-Unat N. (2004) Disputed models of integration: Multiculturalism, Institutionalization of religion, political participation presented in “Conference integration of immigrants from Turkey in Belgium, France, Denmark and Sweden” 2004 Bosphorus University Istanbul.
Akpınar, Aylin (2004). Integration of immigrants from Turkey in Sweden: The case of women presented in “Conference integration of immigrants from Turkey in Belgium, France, Denmark and Sweden” 2004 Bosphorus University Istanbul.
Aksoy, A. and Robins, K. (2002) “Banal Transnationalism: The Difference that Television Makes.” ESRC Transnational Communities Programme. Oxford: WPTC-02-08.
Appadurai, A. (1996) Modernity at Large: Cultural Dimensions of Globalization . Minneapolis and London: University of Minnesota Press
Bibark, Mutlu (2005) Uluslararası Türk-Etnik Yerel Medyası ve Adiyet Tasarımlarının inşaasında rolü / Trans-national Turkish Ethnic Media and its role in construction of identity design. From Yurtdışındaki Türk Medyası Sempozyumu: Bildiriler / Proceedings from conference on Turkish Media Abroad (ed.) Abdülrezzak Altun. Ankara University Faculty of Communication.
Cohen, R. (1997) ‘Global diasporas: an introduction’. London: UCL Press.
Georgiou, M and Silverstone, R. (2005) “Editorial Introduction: Media and ethnic minorities in Europe” Journal of Ethnic and Migration Studies Vol. 31, No. 3, May 2005, pp 433–441. Routledge. Taylor & Francis group. London
Paine, S. (1974) Exporting workers: the Turkish case, Cambridge: Cambridge University Press
Theolin, Sture (2000) The Swedish palace in Istanbul: A thousand years of cooperation between Turkey and Sweden, Yapı Kredi yayıncılık AS. Istanbul, Turkey.
Westin, Charles (2003) “Young People of Migrant Origin in Sweden” in Migration and Labour in Europe. Views from Turkey and Sweden. Emrehan Zeybekoğlu and Bo Johansson (eds.), (Istanbul: MURCIR & NIWL, 2003)

External links 
İsveç Türk İşçileri Dernekleri Federasyonu
Bråda dagar inför det turkiska premiärministerbesöket

 
Sweden
Middle Eastern diaspora in Sweden
Muslim communities in Europe
 
Ethnic groups in Sweden
Islam in Sweden